Oleg Irikovich Umurzakov (born 14 September 1967) is a former Russian professional football player.

Club career
He made his Russian Football National League debut for FC Torpedo Volzhsky on 25 April 1992 in a game against FC Atommash Volgodonsk. He played 5 seasons in the FNL for Torpedo and Lada-Grad.

Honours
 Russian Second Division Zone Center top scorer: 1994 (20 goals).

External links
 

1967 births
Sportspeople from Volgograd
Living people
Soviet footballers
Russian footballers
Association football midfielders
FC Energiya Volzhsky players